Era International School (EIS), established by Era Educational Society, is a residential and day boarding school in Andhra Pradesh, India. It is seven kilometers away from Anantapur, and is situated on a five-acre campus.

The school offers classes from preschool to VIII standard. The school is an English medium, and is affiliated to the Central Board of Secondary Education (CBSE).

History
The school was founded by Ashish Deb, Col. T D Prasad (Retired), Dr. Revathi Susarla, Sumathi Ravichander and Swami Nathan.

References

External links

International schools in India
Schools in Anantapur district
Educational institutions in India with year of establishment missing